Walzer is a German surname. It may refer to:

Andreas Walzer (born 1970), German cyclist and Olympic medalist
Antonio Walzer (1909–unknown), Argentine wrestler and Olympics competitor
Judith Walzer Leavitt (born 1940), American science and medicine historian; sister of Michael Walzer
Michael Walzer (born 1935), American political theorist, editor, and public intellectual; brother of Judith Walzer Leavitt
 (born Josef Walzer; 1888–1966), German Benedictine monk
Richard Rudolf Walzer (1900–1975), German-born British philologist, linguist, orientalist, author, and Farabi scholar
, Austrian author, editor, and historian of Austrian-Jewish studies
Werner Walzer (born 1947), Austrian footballer

See also
Walser (surname)
Waltzer (surname)
Wälzer (surname)

German-language surnames